is a Japanese voice actress affiliated with Arts Vision. She was born in Saitama Prefecture.

Voice roles

Anime television series

 Bush Baby, Little Angel of the Grasslands (Kate Addleton)
 Saiyuki (manga) (Xiahua)
 The Twelve Kingdoms (Hōrin)
 Wedding Peach (Erika)

OVA

 Nightmare Campus (Yuko)
 Urotsukidoji (Hime(Kyo-o)

Game

 Ape Escape (series) (Ukki Pink)
 Blue Breaker Burst (Chimena)
 Dokyusei 2 (Yui Narusawa)
 Fire Woman Matoi-gumi (Lemon)
 Popful Mail (Wriph)
 Princess Maker 2 (Patricia Hearn)
 Princess Maker Pocket Daisakusen (Patricia Hearn)
 Marvel vs. Capcom 2: New Age of Heroes (B.B. Hood)
 Namco × Capcom (Q-Bee)
 Project X Zone 2 (B.B. Hood, Q-Bee, Otohime)
 Vampire Savior: The Lord of Vampire (B.B. Hood, Q-Bee)
 Variable Geo (Erina Goldsmith)

References

External links

Living people
Japanese video game actresses
Japanese voice actresses
Voice actresses from Saitama Prefecture
1969 births
20th-century Japanese actresses
21st-century Japanese actresses
Arts Vision voice actors